Anita Liepiņa ( Stūrīte, born 17 November 1967) is a former Latvian race walker and long-distance runner. Since 2002 she has also practised rogaining.

Her career highlights as a race walker include participation at the 1996, 2000 and 2004 Summer Olympics.
 
At the 5th World Rogaining Championships in Lesná, Czech Republic in 2002 she won a gold medal and the title of the World Rogaining Champion in Mixed Open category in team with Guntars Mankus and Raimonds Lapinš. At 6th World Rogaining Championships in Arizona, United States in 2004 the same team won a bronze medal in Mixed Open category. At 7th World Rogaining Championships in Warrumbungles, Australia in 2006 they regained the title of the World Rogaining Champion in Mixed Open category. At 9th World Rogaining Championships in Cheviot, New Zealand in 2010 she won a bronze medal in Mixed Open category in team with Valters Kaminskis.

She is married to Modris Liepiņš.

Achievements

References

External links
 
 
 
 
 
 

1967 births
Living people
Latvian female racewalkers
Latvian female long-distance runners
Latvian female marathon runners
Olympic athletes of Latvia
Athletes (track and field) at the 1996 Summer Olympics
Athletes (track and field) at the 2000 Summer Olympics
Athletes (track and field) at the 2004 Summer Olympics